Alaska! is an indie rock trio from the United States. The band was formed in San Francisco by Russell Pollard (formerly of Sebadoh and later of the Folk Implosion), Imaad Wasif (also later of Folk Implosion), with Lesley Ishino (formerly of the Red Aunts) later joining as drummer.

Discography
The band released their debut album, Emotions, in 2003, and a second, Rescue Through Tomahawk in 2005.

Emotions (B-Girl Records, February, 2003)
Rescue Through Tomahawk (Altitude Records, 2005)
"Kiss You" (Single) (Altitude Records, 2005)

References

Further reading
 "Creative Alaska! One Heck of an Icebreaker." Pioneer Press. 
 Gold in Alaska! – Page 1 – Music – Dallas – Dallas Observer

Indie rock musical groups from California
Musical groups from San Francisco